Charles Lewis Camp (March 12, 1893 Jamestown, North Dakota – August 14, 1975 San Jose, California) was a palaeontologist and zoologist, working from the University of California, Berkeley. He took part in excavations at the 'Placerias Quarry', in 1930 and the forty Shonisaurus skeleton discoveries of the 1960s, in what is now the Berlin-Ichthyosaur State Park. Camp served as the third director of the University of California Museum of Paleontology from 1930 to 1949, and coincidentally as chair of the UC Berkeley Paleontology Department between 1939 and 1949. Camp named a number of species of marine reptiles such as Shonisaurus and Plotosaurus, as well as the dinosaur Segisaurus.

Camp was also an important bibliographer and historian of Western America. This aspect of his career is represented most notably by two works. The first is his biography of American pioneer James Clyman, which Bernard De Voto called "one of the half-dozen classics in the field." The second work was the third edition of The Plains and the Rockies, published in 1953, which Camp annotated heavily.  He was the 1970 recipient of the California Historical Society's Henry Raup Wagner Memorial Award.

Camp was one of the early members of the revived fraternal order "E Clampus Vitus" and was the Noble Grand Humbug of the Yerba Buena Lodge in 1938.

The theropod Camposaurus was named in Camp's honour in 1998.

Publications 
 California mosasaurs (Berkeley, Los Angeles, University of California Press, 1942).
 Classification of the lizards (New York, NY, 1923, reprinted in 1971). Doctoral thesis.
 Earth song: a prologue to history (Berkeley, California, University of California Press, 1952).
 Bibliography of fossil vertebrates 1944–1948 (Geological Society of America, New York,1953) co-author Morton Green (1917–2003).
 A Study of the Phytosaurs, with description of new material from Western North America (Berkeley, Los Angeles, University of California Press, 1930).
 Methods in Paleontology (California, University of California Press, 1937) co-author G. Dallas Hanna (1887–1970).
  
 Henry R. Wagner and Charles L. Camp, The Plains and the Rockies: A Bibliography of Original Narratives of Travel and Adventure, 1800–1865 (Columbus, OH: Long's College Book Co., 1953).
 James Clyman, Frontiersman, (Portland, OR: Champoeg Press, 1960).

References

External links

 

1893 births
1975 deaths
American paleontologists
Directors of museums in the United States
People from Jamestown, North Dakota
20th-century American zoologists